Guillem Ramon de Moncada or Guillermo II de Bearn (died 1229) was, from 1224 until his death, Lord of Montcada and Castellví de Rosanes (in Catalonia) and, as Guillermo II, Viscount of Bearn, of Marsan, of Gabardan and of Brulhois (in the southwest of present-day France). He was the son of Guillem Ramon de Montcada and Guilleuma de Castellvell.

The main thrust of his policy was the affairs of the Aragonese court, in which several families vied for influence over the young King James I. In particular, he was involved in the preparation for the invasion of the Balearic islands.

In his last visit to Bearn, in February 1228, he promised the representative of the King of England that he would pay the latter homage throughout his lands in Aquitaine (Bearn, Gabardan, Brulhois and Captieux). This act marked the departure of Bearn from within the Aragonese domain and the start of its progressive submission to England.

Back in Catalonia, he played a leading role in the council held in Salou which planned the conquest of Majorca. In September 1229 the fleet left for Majorca, with Guillermo commanding the first ship. The troops having landed, they engaged in the battle of Portopí, thus beginning the conquest of Majorca. The crew had faced little difficulty when they landed on the 12 September. However, Guillermo was killed, along with eight knights of his family, including his nephew Ramon de Moncada in the Sierra de Na Burguesa (Calvia). In the division following the conquest of the island by the Crown of Aragon, the municipality of Costitx was given to Guillermo II de Bearn and thus passed to his heirs.

His mausoleum is in the church of the Monastery of Santes Creus.

Descendants
Guillem Ramon de Moncada had two children with his wife Garsenda (daughter of Alfonso II, Count of Provence and Garsenda de Folcarquier): Gastón, who succeeded him in 1229, and Constanza de Béarn, who married Diego López III de Haro, Lord of Vizcaya.
Constanza de Béarn is a maternal line ancestor of Queen Victoria, Catherine the Great, Felipe VI, Duchess Marie Elisabeth of Saxony, Anne of Bohemia and Hungary, Marie de' Medici,Charles II of England as well as Philip V of Spain. Constanza's own matralineal ancestry can be further traced to Garsenda, Countess of Forcalquier.

References

13th-century people from the Kingdom of Aragon
Military history of Spain
Guillem
1229 deaths
Year of birth missing